Grosvenor Hodgkinson (1818 – 14 February 1881) was an English lawyer and Liberal Party politician who sat in the House of Commons from 1859 to 1874.

Hodgkinson was the son of George Hodgkinson and his wife Julia Beevor, daughter of the Rev. John. Beevor, Rector of Claypole, Lincolnshire. He was educated at the grammar school at Louth, and was admitted an attorney and solicitor in 1839. He was in practice at Newark, in partnership with J. T. B. Pratt, but gave up his legal practice in 1870. He was a director of the Law Life Assurance Co. and the Midland Railway Company and chairman of the London Chatham and Dover Railway. He was also a Justice of the Peace (JP) for Newark and Nottinghamshire.

At the 1859 general election Hodgkinson was elected as a Member of Parliament (MP) for Newark, defeating the sitting Liberal MP the Earl of Lincoln. He was re-elected in 1865 and in 1868, and held the seat until he stood down from Parliament at the 1874 general election.

Hodgkinson died on 15 February 1881, at his home in Newark, aged 62.

Hodgkinson married Alice Harvey, daughter of Robert Harvey of Balderton in 1845.

References

External links

1818 births
1881 deaths
Liberal Party (UK) MPs for English constituencies
UK MPs 1868–1874
UK MPs 1859–1865
UK MPs 1865–1868
English solicitors
People from Newark-on-Trent
People educated at King Edward VI Grammar School, Louth